Astrid Gassner (born 30 October 1995) is an Austrian professional racing cyclist. She rides for the No Radunion Vitalogic team.

See also
 List of 2015 UCI Women's Teams and riders

References

External links
 

1995 births
Living people
Austrian female cyclists
Place of birth missing (living people)
21st-century Austrian women